Alyse Cynthia Eady (born March 15, 1988) is an American news anchor and beauty pageant titleholder who was Miss Arkansas 2010. Eady was named first runner-up at the 2011 Miss America pageant, which was won by Miss Nebraska 2010 Teresa Scanlan.

Biography
Eady is from Fort Smith, Arkansas, and was a caretaker for both of her parents, who were ill when she was growing up. Eady's father became blind and her mother had lupus and had multiple surgeries when Eady was younger. Eady helped out by learning to cook, and assisting her mother to bathe and dress. During high school, she worked as a tutor for the local Boys and Girls Club.

Eady graduated from Ouachita Baptist University with a Bachelor of Arts in Mass Communications and Speech Communication. 

In 2004, she won the title of Miss Teen Arkansas-America 2004, which is now known as Miss Arkansas' Outstanding Teen. She performed in the Variety Act as a special guest during one of the Preliminary Competitions at Miss America 2007 including her yodeling abilities. In 2010, she competed at Miss Arkansas as Miss South Central Arkansas and also won a Preliminary Talent Award and the Coleman Overall Talent Award at the pageant.  Her platform was the Boys & Girls Clubs of America and her talent is a Variety Act, in which she both sings and does ventriloquism to the song "I Want to Be a Cowboy's Sweetheart."  Her act, which also included yodeling, was called "daring and skillful" by The Washington Post. 

At the Miss America pageant in 2011, Eady was named the first runner-up and won $25,000 in scholarships. In 2011, she also appeared on the Late Night Show With David Letterman.

In 2013, Eady married her college sweetheart, Patrick Lemmond, on December 7, 2013.

Eady previously worked as a news anchor for TEGNA-owned KTHV-TV, the local CBS-affiliated television station in Little Rock, Arkansas. In August 2016, Eady joined WAGA-TV in Atlanta, GA as a morning news anchor.

References

External links
 
Alyse Eady's THV11.com biography

Miss America 2011 delegates
People from Fort Smith, Arkansas
Living people
Ouachita Baptist University alumni
Miss America's Outstanding Teen delegates
American beauty pageant winners
Ventriloquists
1988 births
University of Alicante alumni